Ahmadu Bello University Zaria is a federal government research university in Zaria, Kaduna State, Nigeria, opened in 1962 as the University of Northern Nigeria. It was founded by and is now named for Ahmadu Bello, first premier of Northern Nigeria.

The main campus houses administrative offices and faculties of physical sciences, life sciences, social sciences, arts and languages, education, environmental design, engineering, medical sciences, agricultural sciences, and research centres. Kongo hosts faculties of law and administration, the latter addresses accounting, business administration, local government and development studies as well as public administration.

Undergraduate and graduate programmes include affiliate degrees, vocational programmes and remedial courses. The university has one of the largest teaching hospitals in the country to support medical teaching and research.

History

First years

As Nigeria approached independence on October 1, 1960, it had only a single university: the University of Ibadan, established in 1948. The Ashby Report, published a month before independence, supported regional government proposals to add new universities in each of Nigeria's then three regions, and its capital Lagos.

In May 1960, the Northern Region had upgraded the School of Arabic Studies in Kano to become the Ahmadu Bello College for Arabic and Islamic Studies and following the Ashby Report it was decided to create a University of Northern Nigeria at Zaria rather than Kano. The new university was to take over facilities of the Nigerian College of Arts, Science and Technology at Samaru; the Ahmadu Bello College in Kano; the Agricultural Research Institute at Samaru; the Institute of Administration at Zaria, and the Veterinary Research Institute at Vom on the Jos Plateau. Legislation establishing the new university was passed by the Northern Region legislature in 1961.

At opening on 4 October 1962, the university had four faculties comprising 15 departments. though there were only 426 students.

The challenges were enormous. Over 60 years of British colonial rule, education in the Northern Region had lagged far behind that of the two southern regions. Few students from the north had qualifications for university entrance, and fewer still northerners had qualifications for teaching appointments. Of the original student body, only 147 were from the north.

ABU's first vice chancellor was British, as were most professorial appointments. There were only two Nigerians — mathematician Dr Iya Abubakar and Adamu Baikie in the faculty of education — in the first round of faculty appointments. Facilities on the main Samaru campus were inadequate, and integration of physically separate, pre-existing institutions was difficult.

Nevertheless, under the vice chancellorship of New Zealand born Norman Alexander, academic and administrative staff were recruited, new departments and programmes created, major building projects undertaken, and student enrollment grew rapidly. By the end of Alexander's tenure in 1966, there were a thousand students were enrolled.

Middle 1970s

Alexander was succeeded by the university's first native Nigerian vice chancellor, Ishaya Shuaibu Audu. He was a pediatrician; former associate professor at the University of Lagos, and Hausa born in Wusasa, near Zaria.

Ahmadu Bello University was seriously affected by the coups and anti-Igbo riots of 1966 but continued to expand. Student enrollment had been constrained by A-level training at secondary schools so in 1968 the university established its own School of Basic Studies to provide pre-degree training on campus. Students entering the School of Basic Studies could matriculate and complete a bachelor's degree in four years.

Despite opposition to the School of Basic Studies, it provided a stream of candidates for degree courses and the university expanded rapidly. Ten years after being founded there were over 7,000 students, over half in degree programs and 2,333 had graduated. The University of Ibadan had graduated only 615 in its first ten years.

Kongo campus, close to Zaria old city taught public administration and provided in-service training for local government throughout the north of Nigeria. The Faculty of Education taught and also managed teacher training colleges across the northern states. At Kano campus, renamed Abdullahi Bayero College, Hausa, Arabic and Islamic studies courses were taught.

Although founded to be the University of Northern Nigeria, commentators have observed that more than any other of Nigeria's universities, Ahmadu Bello has universally served students from every state of the Nigerian federation.

Professorial staffing to serve the burgeoning student enrollments and course offerings was a potential limitation during this period. In the early 1970s relatively abundant funding made it possible to send some senior academic staff to overseas institutions to complete advanced degrees. A small but increasing number of Nigerians with Ph.D.s or other advanced degrees were returning from abroad (but ABU had to compete with other Nigerian universities to recruit them). In the meantime, appointment of expatriate teaching staff was essential and it expanded greatly and diversified in nationalities. Vice chancellor Audu endeavored to balance the goals of Nigerianization (and "northernization") of ABU's professors with the commitment to maintaining all programmes at an international level of academic quality.

By 1975, this balance was strained. The teaching faculty remained more than half expatriate overall; at senior levels still more so. The development of Nigerian staffing (and especially of northern-origin teaching staff) was perceived as too slow. In 1975, ABU turned toward a much heavier emphasis on internal staff development as it adopted the Graduate Assistantship programme. Under this programme, the best graduates from the departments’ undergraduate programmes are recruited to join the department as staff-in-training and undertake advanced training as they gain on-the-job experience. Within a few years, a significant proportion of ABU senior staff were products of the internal training programme. From 1975, the proportion of expatriate teaching staff diminished rapidly.

Later development

Beginning in the early 1980s, the university was hit with sharply reduced funding as the International Monetary Fund and World Bank imposed their Structural Adjustment Programme on the country. The value of the Nigeria's currency plummeted in relation to others and staff salaries reduced in real terms. Funding for premises, library acquisitions, and other resources was curtailed. Competition for students, staff and funding with other national institutions in what had been a rapidly expanding university system increased.

During a peaceful, May 1986 university rally against implementation of the Structural Adjustment Programme, security forces killed 20 demonstrators and bystanders. Over the years, ABU has been affected by national political instability. The very fact of ABU's strikingly "national character" (in drawing students and staff from an unusually broad range of Nigeria's regional, ethnic and religious communities) might be the reason the institution is inclined to internal instability. Hence, ABU has been among Nigeria's universities that have suffered most from closures.

Yet ABU continues to occupy a particularly important place among Nigerian universities. As it approaches its half-century anniversary, ABU can claim to be the largest and the most extensive of universities in Sub-Saharan Africa. It has five institutes, six specialized centers, a Division of Agricultural Colleges, demonstration secondary and primary schools, as well as extension and consultancy services which provide services to the wider society. The total student enrollment in the university's degree and sub-degree programme is about 35,000, drawn from every state of Nigeria, Africa, and the rest of world. There are about 1,400 academic and research staff and 5,000 support staff.

The university has nurtured two new institutions: Bayero University Kano and the Abubakar Tafawa Balewa University of Technology, Bauchi. Some 27 tertiary institutions made up of colleges of education, polytechnics and schools of basic or preliminary studies are affiliated to it.

Despites the numerous achievements of this reputable institution, there are some challenges that the Institution faces. These challenges vary from one section to another. For instance, in terms of infrastructure, the school does not have enough classrooms for the students from some sections. Based on that, clashes occur on venues especially in the morning when most classes hold. Again, even for sections that have classrooms, those classes tend to be unfit for the number of the students. 
Another challenge that has not yet been checked relating to infrastructure is that of hostels or Hall of residence as it's widely known. The hostels available for students are not capable of accommodating all the students interested in residing within the campus. As a result of that, many new students are stranded on the campus especially at the beginning of the session, and others that are lucky get squatting spaces with friends and family that have already gotten hostels.

Administration

Ahmadu Bello University has a chancellor as its ceremonial head, while the vice-chancellor is chief executive and academic officer. The vice-chancellor is usually appointed for a five-year, non-renewable term.

Library

Kashim Ibrahim Library serves university students and academic staff from the main campus and satellites. , its collections include over 1.2 millions books; 66,000 periodicals, and other learning materials.
https://digitalcommons.unl.edu/libphilprac/78

The library was established in 1955 comprising a single small room, later converted to a staff club. In 1963, a replacement building was constructed at a cost of $39,000 named for the then state governor.

Notable alumni

The Ahmadu Bello University is notable for producing prominent people and Nigerian leaders, including many former and current state governors and ministers. Amongst the alumni are:

 Magaji Abdullahi, former national chairman of the National Centre Party of Nigeria (NCPN), former senator, former deputy governor
 Alash'le Abimiku, executive director of the International Research Centre of Excellence at the Institute of Human Virology Nigeria
 Muhammed K. Abubakar, academic, former minister
 Mohammed Bello Adoke, former Minister of Justice & Attorney General of the Federation
 Ahmed Abdullah, OON, former Agriculture and Rural Development Minister 
 Atiku Abubakar GCON, former vice president, Federal Republic of Nigeria
 Yayale Ahmed, former secretary to the Government of the Federation 
 Aisha Alhassan, former minister of women affairs
 Adamu Aliero, former governor, Kebbi State
Saratu Iya Aliyu
 Solomon Arase, former IGP, Nigeria Police Force
 Ayodele Awojobi, scientist and professor at University of Lagos
 Sunday Awoniyi, Northern Yoruba Leader, former chairman ACF
 Anthony Ayine, auditor general for the Federation
 Ahmed Nuhu Bamalli Current Emir of Zazzau and former Ambassador to Thailand 
 Mohammed Bawa, former Ekiti State governor
 Yahaya Bello, governor, Kogi state
 Franca Brown, actress.
 Maryam Ciroma, former Minister of Women Affairs 
 Yahaya Abubakar Abdullahi, Senate Majority Leader of the Nigerian 9th National Assembly
 Ibrahim Hassan Dankwambo, former governor, Gombe State
 Usman Saidu Nasamu Dakingari, former governor, Kebbi State
 Lawal Musa Daura, former director general, Nigerian State Security Service
 Oladipo Diya, GCON, former vice president/CGS, Federal Republic of Nigeria
 Ibrahim Hussaini Doko, DG of Raw materials Nigeria
 Donald Duke, former Cross River state governor
 Saddiq Dzukogi, poet and professor of English, Mississippi State University
 Afakriya Gadzama, former Director General Nigerian State Security Service
 Ibrahim Gaidam, former governor, Yobe State
 Jerry Gana, former information minister
 Abubakar Ibn Umar Garba, Shehu of Borno
 Ibrahim Garba, former vice chancellor (ABU)
 Kabiru Ibrahim Gaya, former Kano state governor
 Isa Marte Hussaini, professor, pharmacologist
 Bukar Ibrahim, former governor, Yobe State
 Ibrahim Kpotun Idris, former IGP, Nigeria Police Force
 Catherine Uju Ifejika, chairman and CEO, Brittania-U Limited
 Azubuike Ihejirika, former Chief of Army Staff
 Attahiru Jega, professor, former chairman, Independent National Electoral Commission (INEC)
 Zainab Abdulkadir Kure, politician
 Aisha Augie-Kuta, photographer
 Idris Legbo Kutigi, former chief justice of Nigeria
 Shehu Ladan, former group MD, NNPC
 Sanusi Lamido, former governor Central Bank of Nigeria, former Emir of Kano
 Ibrahim Lamorde, former chairman, EFCC
 Rilwanu Lukman, former secretary general OPEC & Petroleum Minister
 Muhammad Nasirudeen Maiturare, professor, former vice Chancellor, IBBUL, Niger State
 Ahmed Makarfi, former Kaduna state governor
 Umaru Tanko Al-Makura, former governor, Nasarawa State
 Dino Melaye, senator, Kogi West
 Ahmed Tijjani Mora, pharmacist, president of ABU Alumni Association
 Faruk Imam Muhammad, justice, Kogi state Judiciary
 Magaji Muhammed OFR, former Minister of Internal Affairs, former Minister of Industries and former Ambassador to the Kingdom of Saudi Arabia 
 Mansur Muhtar, former executive director of the World Bank
 Dahiru Musdapher, former chief justice of Nigeria
 Abdullahi Mustapha, former vice chancellor (ABU)
 Ghali Umar Na'Abba, former Speaker, House of Representatives
 Usman Bayero Nafada, former deputy speaker, House of Representatives
 Muhammad Mamman Nami, Executive Chairman, Federal Inland Revenue Service FIRS
 Rebecca Ndjoze-Ojo, Namibian, politician
 Demas Nwoko, artist and architect
 Olufemi Obafemi, Poet, Playwright, and Author
 Samuel Oboh, architect
 Gani Odutokun, artist and educator
 Uche Okeke, artist and educator 
 Mike Omotosho, national chairman of the Labour Party (Nigeria)
 Bruce Onobrakpeya, artist
 Samuel Ortom, former Minister of State Trade and Investments
 Jude Rabo, vice-chancellor of Federal University, Wukari
 Nuhu Ribadu, former chairman, EFCC
 Nasir Ahmad el-Rufai, governor of Kaduna State
 Aminu Safana, doctor/politician
 Namadi Sambo, former vice president of Nigeria
 Faisal Shuaib, medical doctor,  Executive Director and Chief Executive Officer of Nigeria's National Primary Health Care Development Agency
 Ibrahim Shekarau, former Kano state governor
 Ibrahim Shema, former governor, Katsina State
 Abdullahi Aliyu Sumaila, administrator
 Ussif Rashid Sumaila, economist
 Danbaba Suntai, former governor, Taraba State
 Ibrahim Umar, former vice chancellor and scientist
 Patrick Ibrahim Yakowa, former governor Kaduna state
 Nenadi Usman, former finance minister
 Shamsuddeen Usman, former Minister of National Planning
 Auwal H Yadudu Nigerian academician and Vice-Chancellor of the Federal University, Birnin Kebbi, Kebbi State
 Andrew Yakubu, former group MD, NNPC
 Turai Yar'Adua, former first lady
 Umaru Musa Yar'Adua, GCFR, former president of Nigeria
 Isa Yuguda, former governor, Bauchi State
 Ibrahim Zakzaky prominent Shi'ite-Islam cleric, founder Islamic Movement in Nigeria

Alumni Association

Ahmadu Bello University Alumni Association is an alumni organization for former students of the Ahmadu Bello University. The alumni association is often represented by the national president of the association in the governing council of the university. This is necessary for the association to make a direct input into the university's policies.

The national body of the association currently has 17 National Executive Committee (NEC) members who manage the affairs of the association in alignment with the provisions of the association constitution.
The incumbent national president of the alumni association is Ahmed Tijani Mora, a renowned pharmacist and former registrar and chief executive officer of the Pharmacists Council of Nigeria.

History
The alumni association was founded in the early 1960s by the graduating class which included architect Chief Fola Alade, Chief Lai Balogun and Professor Ayodele Awojobi.
Today, the alumni association has branches across the federation with the secretariat at Ahmadu Bello University, Zaria. Since the inception of the association, the governing council of Ahmadu Bello University has maintained a strong working relationship with the association with the aim of developing the university. Initially, the association was under the supervision of the deputy vice chancellor of the university. Today it is directly under the office of the vice chancellor and supervised by the vice chancellor.

See also
List of universities in Nigeria
Academic libraries in Nigeria

References

External links

 
Educational institutions established in 1962
Federal universities of Nigeria
1962 establishments in Nigeria
Zaria
Universities and colleges in Kaduna State
Academic libraries in Nigeria